Tridrepana rubromarginata is a moth in the family Drepanidae. It was described by John Henry Leech in 1898. It is found in China, India, Bhutan and Nepal.

The wingspan is about 33 mm. The forewings are yellow, the outer margin bordered with reddish brown from vein 6 to the inner margin. The antemedial line is blackish and undulated and the postmedial line is blackish, wavy and interrupted towards the costa. The submarginal line is blackish, wavy but indistinct towards the costa and the inner margin and there is a black spot on the inner margin, representing the termination of each of these lines. There are also two blackish spots in the discal cell, an eight-shaped mark at the end of the cell and a more or less round one below it, the upper part of the eight mark is centred with whitish. The reddish marginal border is traversed by a wavy line of the ground colour. The hindwings are paler with traces of transverse markings, mostly confined to the abdominal area and there is a blackish spot between veins 2 and 3, and another between veins 3 and 4, the former centred with white.

Subspecies
Tridrepana rubromarginata rubromarginata (China: Gansu, Fujian, Sichuan, Yunnan)
Tridrepana rubromarginata indica Watson, 1957 (India, Bhutan, Nepal, China: Tibet)

References

Moths described in 1898
Drepaninae